Brio is a Canadian variation of a chinotto soft drink. Chinotto is a bittersweet flavoured carbonated soft drink originating in Italy in the 1930s. Brio is known to be a sweeter variant.

Brio was created by three Italian immigrants in Toronto, Ontario, Canada, in 1959—Elio Madonia, who immigrated to Canada in 1950 from Corleone, Sicily, and his partners Giuseppe Panacci and Angelo Pirrello that he had met during his time as an insurance salesman. The chinotto extract is imported from Italy, but bottled in Canada. It has become a popular beverage in Ontario, particularly among Italian immigrants, serving as a marker of identity for the Italian emigrant population in Canada.

In April 2018, the Liquor Control Board of Ontario launched an alcoholic version of Brio mixed with vodka.

References 

Fruit sodas
Products introduced in 1959
Canadian drinks